Alfred Gilmore (June 9, 1812 – June 29, 1890) was a Democratic member of the U.S. House of Representatives from Pennsylvania.

Biography
Alfred Gilmore (son of John Gilmore) was born in Butler, Pennsylvania.  He was graduated from Washington College in Washington, Pennsylvania, in 1833.  He studied law, was admitted to the bar in 1836 and commenced practice in Butler.

Gilmore was elected as a Democrat to the Thirty-first and Thirty-second Congresses.  He was not a candidate for reelection in 1852.  He resumed the practice of law in Philadelphia, and later moved to Lenox, Massachusetts, in 1866, and continued the practice of his profession.  He died while on a visit in New York City in 1890.  Interment in Lenox Cemetery in Lenox, Massachusetts.

Sources

The Political Graveyard

1812 births
1890 deaths
Washington & Jefferson College alumni
Pennsylvania lawyers
Democratic Party members of the United States House of Representatives from Pennsylvania
19th-century American politicians
19th-century American lawyers